The St Antonius Church, Egg is a Catholic Church in Egg, Zürich, Switzerland, dedicated to Anthony of Padua. Because of its importance as a place of pilgrimage it has been called "little-Padua".

Architecture 

In 1921 the architect Joseph Löhlein built a small, wooden chapel dedicated to Anthony of Padua on the grounds of the modern-day church.  The chapel was later extended to its current size with additional buildings being added in 1939 and 1997.

History and place of pilgrimage 

The parish grounds its historical association with Anthony of Padua in the allegedly miraculous recovery of Pater Anton Bolte, who later was in charge of the parish, from a fatal illness in 1925.

In 1926 Pope Pius XI visited the parish and bestowed a relic of Anthony of Padua upon it. The relic is still held by the parish and is being used for liturgical purposes.

References

External links

Churches in the canton of Zürich
Roman Catholic churches in Switzerland